Events from the year 1997 in Canada.

Incumbents

Crown 
 Monarch – Elizabeth II

Federal government 
 Governor General – Roméo LeBlanc
 Prime Minister – Jean Chrétien
 Chief Justice – Antonio Lamer (Quebec) 
 Parliament – 35th (until 27 April) then 36th (from September 22)

Provincial governments

Lieutenant governors 
Lieutenant Governor of Alberta – Bud Olson 
Lieutenant Governor of British Columbia – Garde Gardom  
Lieutenant Governor of Manitoba – Yvon Dumont
Lieutenant Governor of New Brunswick – Margaret McCain (until April 18) then Marilyn Trenholme Counsell 
Lieutenant Governor of Newfoundland – Frederick Russell (until February 5) then Arthur Maxwell House  
Lieutenant Governor of Nova Scotia – James Kinley 
Lieutenant Governor of Ontario – Hal Jackman (until January 24) then Hilary Weston 
Lieutenant Governor of Prince Edward Island – Gilbert Clements
Lieutenant Governor of Quebec – Jean-Louis Roux (until January 30) then Lise Thibault 
Lieutenant Governor of Saskatchewan – Jack Wiebe

Premiers 
Premier of Alberta – Ralph Klein 
Premier of British Columbia – Glen Clark 
Premier of Manitoba – Gary Filmon 
Premier of New Brunswick – Frank McKenna (until October 14) then Raymond Frenette 
Premier of Newfoundland – Brian Tobin 
Premier of Nova Scotia – John Savage (until July 18) then Russell MacLellan
Premier of Ontario – Mike Harris 
Premier of Prince Edward Island – Pat Binns 
Premier of Quebec – Lucien Bouchard
Premier of Saskatchewan – Roy Romanow

Territorial governments

Commissioners 
 Commissioner of Yukon –  Judy Gingell 
 Commissioner of Northwest Territories – Helen Maksagak

Premiers 
Premier of the Northwest Territories – Don Morin 
Premier of Yukon – Piers McDonald

Events

January to June
January 1 – Opening of the new municipality of Alfred and Plantagenet.
January 4 – The federal government makes it harder to obtain unemployment insurance.
February 14 – Newsprint giants Abitibi-Price and Stone-Consolidated announce they are merging.
March 6 – A new rigorous anti tobacco advertising law is passed.
March 11 – Alberta election: Ralph Klein's PCs win an eighth consecutive majority.
March 15 – Gilles Duceppe is elected leader of the Bloc Québécois.
March 19 – Bre-X geologist Michael de Guzman jumps or is pushed from a helicopter in Indonesia.
March 21 – Nova Scotia Premier John Savage announces his resignation.
April 22 – Massive flooding of the Red River in Manitoba leads to a state of emergency.
May – Saint-Simon and Saint-Sauveur riots.
May 11 – 1997 Nunavut equal representation plebiscite.
May 31 – Confederation Bridge opens.
June 1 – Donovan Bailey and Michael Johnson have a 150m race in the then Skydome for the title of "The World's Fastest Man"
June 2 – Federal election: Jean Chrétien's Liberals win a second consecutive majority, the Reform Party becomes the Official Opposition.
June 18 – The Canadian Radio-television and Telecommunications Commission (CRTC) introduces a television rating system.

July to September
July 2 – The Somalia Inquiry is disbanded prematurely.
July 9 – Danielle House forced to give up her Miss Canada International title after pleading guilty to assault.
July 18 – Russell MacLellan becomes the new Premier of Nova Scotia.
July 30 – Phil Fontaine elected head of the Assembly of First Nations.
August 7 – Bjarni Tryggvason flies aboard the Space Shuttle.
August 10 – The director Jean-Claude Lauzon and actress Marie-Soleil Tougas dies in a plane crash near Kuujjuaq.
September 2 – Newfoundlanders vote to do away with their religion based school systems.
September 3 – One is killed in a Saskatchewan train derailment.
September 15 – Caillou debuts on Teletoon.

October to December

October 1 – Michel Bastarache is appointed to the Supreme Court.
October 2 – Canada recalls its ambassador to Israel after Mossad uses forged Canadian passports.
October 7 – An out-of-court settlement is reached between Brian Mulroney and the federal government regarding the Airbus affair.
October 13 – Raymond Frenette becomes premier of New Brunswick, replacing Frank McKenna.
October 13 – 43 are killed in Canada's worst ever traffic accident as a tour bus falls off a cliff.
October 17 – CTV News Channel begins broadcasting.
October 27 – November 10 – A teachers strike takes place in Ontario.
November 3 – Canada destroys the last land mines in its arsenal.
November 9 – The scandal-racked Saskatchewan Progressive Conservative Party is mothballed.
November 14 – Fourteen-year-old Reena Virk is beaten to death by classmates in Victoria, British Columbia.
November 17 – The Hibernia oil project pumps its first barrel of oil.
November 21 – November 25 – The APEC summit is held in Vancouver, British Columbia.  Controversy arises when Royal Canadian Mounted Police use force and pepper spray to remove protesters.
December 3 – In Ottawa, Ontario, representatives from 121 countries sign a treaty prohibiting the manufacture and deployment of anti-personnel land mines. However, the United States, the People's Republic of China, and Russia do not sign the treaty.

Full date unknown
 The Calgary Declaration from the premiers, except Lucien Bouchard.
 A second Sacred Assembly is held but issues no proclamation.

Arts and literature

New Books
Timothy Findley – You Went Away

Awards
Giller Prize for Canadian Fiction: Mordecai Richler – Barney's Version
See 1997 Governor General's Awards for a complete list of winners and finalists for those awards.
Books in Canada First Novel Award: Anne Michaels, Fugitive Pieces
Geoffrey Bilson Award: Janet McNaughton, To Dance at the Palais Royale
Gerald Lampert Award: Marilyn Dumont, A Really Good Brown Girl
Marian Engel Award: Katherine Govier
Pat Lowther Award: Marilyn Bowering, Autobiography
Stephen Leacock Award: Arthur Black, Black in the Saddle Again
Trillium Book Award English: Dionne Brand, Land to Light On
Trillium Book Award French: Roger Levac, Petite Crapaude!
Vicky Metcalf Award: Tim Wynne-Jones

Film
 Atom Egoyan's The Sweet Hereafter is released, it is nominated for the Academy Award for Best Director

Television
The Arrow, a mini-series about the Avro Arrow shows plays to great popularity and acclaim and the CBC
Teletoon is launched

Music
Oscar Peterson receives a Grammy for lifetime achievement.

Sport
February 7 – Lennox Lewis becomes heavyweight boxing champion.
May 18 – Hull Olympiques win their only Memorial Cup by defeating the Lethbridge Hurricanes 5 to 1. The entire tournament was played at the Robert Guertin Centre in Hull, Quebec
June 7 – Calgary's Mike Vernon of the Detroit Red Wings is awarded the Conn Smythe Trophy
October 26 – Formula One: Jacques Villeneuve becomes the first Canadian to become World Drivers Champion.
November 9 – The Montreal Screwjob takes place at Survivor Series. Bret Hart controversially loses his WWF Championship to Shawn Michaels.
November 16 – Toronto Argonauts win their fourteenth Grey Cup by defeating the Saskatchewan Roughriders in the 85th Grey Cup played at Commonwealth Stadium in Edmonton. Hamilton, Ontario's Paul Masotti was awarded the game's Most Valuable Canadian
November 22 – UBC Thunderbirds win their third Vanier Cup by defeating the Ottawa Gee-Gees by a score of 39–23 in the 33rd Vanier Cup played at Skydome in Toronto

Births
January 13 – Connor McDavid, hockey player
January 15 – Alex Cardillo, Irish-born actor
January 20 – Jeffrey Baldwin, murder victim (died 2002)
January 29 – Cassandra Sawtell, actress
March 9 – Niamh Wilson, actress
March 10 – Travis Konecny, ice hockey player  
March 11 – Matreya Fedor, actress
March 26 – Antoine L'Écuyer, actor
April 23 – Alex Ferris, actor
April 28 – Jason Spevack, actor
May 5 – Mitch Marner, ice hockey player
May 26 – Mathew Barzal, ice hockey player
June 11 – Mackenzie Bent, ice dancer
June 18 – Mary-Lynn Neil, singer and songwriter
August 3 – Ayaka Wilson, actor
October 27 – Eliana Jones, actress and gymnast

Deaths

January to March
January 1 – Hagood Hardy, composer, pianist and vibraphonist (born 1937)
January 12
Charles Brenton Huggins, physician, physiologist, cancer researcher and Nobel prize laureate (born 1901)
January 14 – Dollard Ménard, lieutenant-colonel
January 17 – Bill Kardash, politician (born 1912)
January 26 – Norman Fawcett, politician (born 1910)
February 19 – Lois Marshall, soprano (born 1924)
March 2 – J. Carson Mark, mathematician who worked on development of nuclear weapons (born 1913)
March 14 – Ivan Romanoff, conductor
March 22 – Harry Thode, geochemist, nuclear chemist and academic administrator (born 1910)
March 27 – Hugh Horner, politician, physician and surgeon (born 1925)

April to June
April 6 – Jack Kent Cooke, sports entrepreneur (born 1912)
May 1 – Fernand Dumont, sociologist, philosopher, theologian and poet (born 1927)
May 9 – Marie-Thérèse Paquin, Canadian pianist (b. 1905)
June 9 – Stanley Knowles, politician (born 1908)
June 22
Gérard Pelletier, journalist, editor, politician and Minister (born 1919)
Larry Grossman, politician (born 1943)

July to September
July 30 – Robert Bryce, civil servant (born 1910)
August 10
Jean-Claude Lauzon, Quebec filmmaker (born 1953)
Marie-Soleil Tougas, Quebec actress and TV host (born 1970)
August 20 – Léon Dion, political scientist (born 1922)
August 24 – Hardial Bains, founder and leader of Communist Party of Canada (Marxist-Leninist) (born 1939)
September 11 – Camille Henry, ice hockey player (born 1933)
September 12 – Judith Merril, science fiction writer, editor and political activist (born 1923)
September 30
Rose Goldblatt, administrator, pianist and teacher (born 1913) 
Pierre Granche, sculptor (born 1948)

October to December
October 12 – Rodrigue Bourdages, politician (born 1923)
November 7 – Clyde Gilmour, radio broadcaster and journalist (born 1912)
November 14 – Jack Pickersgill, civil servant and politician (born 1905)
November 20 – Ronald Martland, Justice of the Supreme Court of Canada (born 1909)
November 24
 Czeslaw Brzozowicz, engineer (born 1911)
 John Sopinka, lawyer and puisne justice on the Supreme Court of Canada (born 1933)
November 27 – Yves Prévost, politician and lawyer (born 1908)
December 7 – George R. Gardiner, businessman, philanthropist and co-founder of the Gardiner Museum (born 1917)
December 24 – Pierre Péladeau, businessman (born 1925)

Full date unknown
Hilda Watson, Leader of the Yukon Progressive Conservative Party (born 1922)

See also
 1997 in Canadian television
 List of Canadian films of 1997

References 

 
Years of the 20th century in Canada
Canada
1997 in North America